James Hendren (17 July 1885 – 17 June 1915) was a Scottish professional footballer who made over 120 appearances in the Scottish League for Hibernian as a centre forward. He also played for Nithsdale Wanderers, Kilmarnock and Cowdenbeath.

Personal life 
Hendren worked as a miner in Ayrshire and later emigrated to the USA. He returned to Scotland to resume his football career and he enlisted as a driver in the Army Service Corps after the outbreak of the First World War in 1914. Hendren was allowed to delay his enlistment, as his wife had just given birth to their second child. Just over a month after his final appearance for Hibernian, Hendren died of acute pneumonia at the Royal Infirmary of Edinburgh on 17 June 1915. His great-nephew is former Hibernian and Celtic footballer Pat Stanton.

Honours 

 Cowdenbeath Hall of Fame

Career statistics

References

1885 births
1915 deaths
British Army personnel of World War I
Scottish footballers
Association football forwards
Scottish Football League players
Nithsdale Wanderers F.C. players
Kilmarnock F.C. players
Cowdenbeath F.C. players
Hibernian F.C. players
Footballers from Fife
Scottish expatriates in the United States
Deaths from pneumonia in Scotland
Scottish miners
Scottish people of Irish descent
Royal Army Service Corps soldiers
British military personnel killed in World War I